Calumpit, officially the Municipality of Calumpit,  is a 1st class municipality in the province of Bulacan, Philippines. According to the 2020 census, it has a population of 118,471 people.

Etymology 
The name "Calumpit" comes from the tree "Kalumpít", an indigenous hardwood species similar to apalit and narra, which grows abundantly in front of the St. John the Baptist Parish Church in the Población-Sucol area.

History

Precolonial era
Calumpit was already an established barangay under the leadership of Gat Maitim prior to the Fall of the Kingdom of Tondo in June 1571. Other nearby villages were Gatbuka, Meyto, Meysulao, Pandukot, Malolos, Macabebe, Hagonoy, and Apalit. When Calumpit was hispanised and established as a political and geographical entity in 1572, they chose what is today Barangay Población as the site of the church and the administrative center of the aforementioned villages, which were annexed to it.

Spanish period
Upon hearing that the Kingdom of Tondo was conquered by Martín de Goíti and Juan Salcedo, and that Rajah Matanda allied with the Spaniards in May 1571, Bambalito formed a fleet of two thousand natives mostly from Hagonoy and Macabebe. They sailed across Manila Bay to Tondo on June 3, 1571, facing Goíti and Salcedo in the historic Battle of Bangkusay. Bambalito and the natives were defeated and the conquerors proceeded northwards to pacify other villages along the coast of Manila Bay.

In September 1571, Goíti and Salcedo, along with the invading forces, arrived at Lubao. On November 14, 1571, they reached Calumpit and Malolos and reported it to Miguel López de Legazpi, the first Spanish Governor-General of the Philippines. The two settlements were then constituted as the Encomienda de Calumpit and Encomienda de Malolos, respectively. The Encomienda de Calumpit was entrusted to Sargento Juan Moron, one of the conquerors in the Legazpi Expedition.

Christianization
It is uncertain as to exactly when the Augustinians first set foot in Calumpit, but according to the documents, Calumpit was already a parish by May 3, 1572, when Fray Martín de Rada was elected Prior Provincial. Calumpit was simultaneously established with the conventos of Bay, Laguna, Tondo and Lubao, Pampanga, with De Rada as its prior and Fray Diego Vivar as his vicar.

Accounts state that the Augustinian missionaries planted a wooden cross along the bank of the Meyto River to symbolise the baptism of the land, and they built a chapel made of nipa and bamboo. Later, they moved to Meysulao and built another visita, and then in Panducot, where they built another chapel dedicated to Our Lady of the Visitation as Fray Gaspar de San Agustín mentioned in his Conquistas delas Isla Philipinas (Libro Segundo, Chapter 9). Subsequently, the missionary headquarters was moved again to a much higher place where a very huge and prominent tree called "Kalumpit" (Terminalia macrocarpa decne) stands as the original settlers named the place. Another notable characteristic of the village of Calumpit is that it was bounded by rivers which served as a natural moat-like feature. Primarily, Meyto, Meysulao, Panducot and Calumpit was independent barangays under their own chiefs, it is same with Gatbuka, Bugyon and other old settlements. On April 5, 1572, Legaspi merged the villages of Meyto, Meysulao, Panducot, Calumpit, Candaba, Apalit and Malolos and these villages became ministerios and visitas and these settlements first formed the town named Calumpit, with present-day Calumpit as center. On December 28, 1575, Gov. General Francisco Sande ordered the inclusion of the villages of Agonoy (Hagonoy), Quinabalonan (now Santa Monica and San Jose, Hagonoy), and some villages along Macabebe river to the town of Calumpit.

Early Spanish presence
When Calumpit was already pacified by Spaniards and submitted under the colonial rule, On April 5, 1572, Encomiendas of Calumpit and Malolos was unified under the shared administration of their encomenderos Don Marcos de Herrera and Sargento Mayor Juan Moron. One month later on the same year Calumpit was created as one of the centers of the Augustinian ministry in Northern Luzon with Convento de Lubao Pampanga, which includes Betis and Bacolor and Convento de Taal Batangas established on May 3, 1572, upon the election of Fray Martín de Rada as the new Prior Provincial of the Augustinians replacing Fray Diego de Herrera who was recalled to Mexico. This parochial beginnings of Calumpit have included the old villages of Hagonoy, Apalit, Candaba, Malolos and Macabebe as its missions. The town of Calumpit was originally dedicated to Saint Nicholas of Tolentino, but in December 1576, the town was re-dedicated to the patronage of Saint John the Baptist.

Province of Calumpit
On December 28, 1575, Governor-General Francisco de Sande established Calumpit as an Alcaldia (Province) with Marcos de Arce as the first Alcalde Mayor, with Calumpit and nearby visitas and settlements such as Malolos, Hagonoy, Macabebe, Apalit and Candaba. Later in 1576, jurisdiction of Macabebe transferred to the town of Lubao and Candaba separated and became town, then on June 11, 1580, Malolos became a town and it was transferred to Alcaldia de Bulacan. In 1581, Hagonoy had its own convent but still under the Governor of Calumpit, while in 1591 Apalit officially separated and established as an independent town and it was transferred in the reconfigured territory of Pampanga province. In Miguel de Loarca's document in 1581 called Relación de las Islas Filipinas and the June 1591 document of Governor-General Luis Pérez de Dasmariñas, it is proven that Calumpit appears as an independent Alcaldia, independent of those of Bulacan and Lubao and Betis. It was therefore established as an Encomienda and Alcaldia separate to Province of Bulacan. Contrary to popular belief, Calumpit was not only the first town founded in Bulacan, but it existed as a province.

Abolition
The Alcaldia de Calumpit was eventually abolished and the towns of Calumpit and Hagonoy were annexed to the Province of Bulacan. Neighbouring Apalit was meanwhile annexed to Pampanga.

Philippine Revolution and Philippine-American War 
During the Philippine Revolution in 1896, Calumpiteños participated in battles launched by the Katipunan against the Spanish Empire. Many notable Calumeteños helped establish and support the Malolos Republic, with the town serving as a defense line due to its proximity to the new capital. When the Philippine–American War erupted, Calumpit become the headquarters of General Antonio Luna in 1898. In the bloody encounters at Barrio Bagbag on April 25, 1899, many people joined the army of General Luna. During the conflict, the bridge, convent and church of the town were burned and completely destroyed.

Civil administration under the United States-led Insular Government was established in Calumpit in April 1901, with Juan Galang serving as the first elected American-era mayor of the town.

American Occupation and World War II 

Calumpit played an important role at the outbreak of the Second World War in the Pacific theater. The bridge of Calumpit, on the way to Bataan was demolished by the Engineering Battalion of the U.S., impeding movement of the Japanese forces on their way to Bataan. In January 1942, the Japanese Government occupied Calumpit for three years, during which many of the townsfolk died.

In the middle of 1943, the first part of the USAFFE guerrilla was established under the leadership of Luis Macam, with most of the members from Calumpit.

In June 1944, the 4th Battalion of the Del Pilar Regiment was established under the leadership of Major Francisco del Rosario. They continued fighting until the returned of the USAFFE under the leadership of General Douglas MacArthur.

In January 1945, the combined Filipino and American troops arrived in the town, liberating it from Japanese control.

Geography

Calumpit is sprawled over an area of 5,625 has. of flat terrain classified accordingly to use for agricultural (66.81%), residential (10.42%), industrial (2.48%), commercial, (0.89%) and other (1.05%) purposes. It occupies around 2.06% of the total land area of Bulacan. The municipality has 144.33 kilometers of concrete roads that easily link its 29 barangays.

Two distinct seasons characterize the town's climate: rainy season which starts late May and ends around November; and dry season which begins November and lasts until April.

Calumpit has two types of soil – the silt loam which is found in almost 90% of the entire municipality and the clay loam in the south-east far end of the town. Both types are basically suited for agricultural purposes as per Department of Agriculture (Philippines) classifications.

Calumpit River

The stretch of waterway where two great rivers traversing through Calumpit, the Angat River and the Pampanga River is referred to as the Calumpit River.

This river has shaped the lives of Bulakeños since time immemorial. With the longest river system in Bulacan, Calumpit River traverses the towns of Calumpit, Pulilan and Plaridel on the east, Paombong and Hagonoy in the West and winds up through Apalit, Macabebe and Masantol, Pampanga.

It was the major route for trade and commerce in this part of the Luzon prior to the arrival of Spain. The Pampanga and Quingua Rivers served as arteries through which goods coming in and going out of Calumpit passed. At present, the river is a valued resource as a rich fishing ground and providing farmers with irrigation.

Climate
The climate of Calumpit is similar to that of the rest of the other municipalities in the province of Bulacan. It is characterized by two (2) distinct seasons namely, the rainy and the dry. The rainy seasons starts from late May and ends around November, the dry season from December to April. The annual number of rainy days is 175 days.

Barangays
Calumpit is divided into 29 barangays.

Demographics

Calumpit's population was 101,068 in the Philippine Statistics Authority (NSO) 2010 census. Historically, its population grew at an average of 3.71% per annum.

The barangay with the largest population is Iba Oeste, with 10,610 residents, while the smallest is Sucol with 1,410 residents.

Calumpit has a relatively young population, with the age group 1–19 years old, constituting 46.01% of the total population. The rest consists mainly of the working group between the ages of 20 to 59 years old accounting for about 47.96% and the elderly comprising 6.02%.

In terms of sex distribution, males exceeded the number of females very slightly with a count of 35,710 and 35,087, respectively.

Language 
Calumpit is a predominantly Tagalog-speaking town, with about 96.3% of its people being fluent speakers. Residents in the northernmost barangays (bordering Apalit) speak Kapampangan while a minority speak other Philippine languages.

Religion

As Calumpit is the first town in Bulacan to have been Christianized by the Spaniards in 1572, about 80% of residents profess the Roman Catholic faith. Under the United States and because of the eventual disestablishment of the Catholic Church in the Philippines in 1902, Protestantism gained a foothold in the municipality. Significant religious minorities include the Iglesia ni Cristo, Members Church of God International, Iglesia Filipina Independiente.

Among the oldest churches in Bulacan found in Calumpit is the San Juan Bautista Church. Constructed under Augustinian friars Martín de Rada and Diego Vivar, it was initially made of nipa and bamboo and gradually built of stone in 1700. It enshrines the local patron saint, John the Baptist, whose liturgical birthday on 24 June is celebrated as the town fiesta.

Inside the church is a tunnel that, as legend would have it, was used by priests during the Spanish era as an escape route in the event of Chinese and Moro pirate attacks. It is a declared Diocesan Shrine of the Diocese of Malolos.

The Meyto Shrine marks the cradle of Christianity in western Bulacan, where a wooden cross was first planted and first mass in the region was said in May 1572. The shrine, located in the western part of town, is also the site of the original church of Calumpit, predating the existing one in the town centre. During the Philippine Revolution, the Iglesia Filipina Independiente – which had by then separated from the Catholic Church – took over Meyto Shrine.

Labor and employment 
In 1995, Calumpit had a relatively big labor force of 24,095 or 66% of the population aged 20–59. Around 35% of these skilled and were employed in their respective occupations; 28% were housewives with occasional employment as farmhands, selling farm produce in the market and doing marginal odd jobs. Others were unclassified and consisted mostly of students, out-of-school youth and the unemployed.

Total household income per annum is ₱705 million, with the annual average household income is ₱66,600 and per capita income annually is ₱12,198.

Literacy
The high literacy rate (98.5%) is maintained by its 24 elementary schools and six secondary or high schools. The Bulacan Manpower and Livelihood Training Center (BMLTC), based at the heart of the town, offers vocational courses and serves as the training ground for both unskilled and highly skilled workers. As a result, most Calumpiteños have acquired and maintained skills suited for employment especially in the agro-industrial field.

Economy

Major industries
Industrial estates
Handicrafts
Food processing
Paper
Garments
Ceramics/pottery
Flowers/ornamental plants
Houseware

Major products
Longganisang Calumpit
Key chains, key holders, pen holders
Company Uniforms
Corporate giveaways

Industrial estates
Bulacan Agro-Industrial Subdivision (Barangay Pio Cruzcosa)

Printing Services
Imprentas Printing Services - Sitio Danga, Brgy. San Miguel

Tourism and culture

Festivals
Calumpit celebrates its town fiesta from June 23 to 24. The Libad is a river procession held every Saint John's Eve on June 23 to honour the town's patron. Calumpiteños sing, dance and douse water to "baptize" passers-by, recalling the saint's characteristic act. The ritual and its traditional route are relics of the old fluvial procession held when Apalit and Hagonoy were still governed from Calumpit. The festivities carry on to the next day, June 24, the feast of Saint John the Baptist.

One of the oldest barangays in the town, established in 1575, Santa Lucia is very popular and famous because of the supposedly miraculous image of its patroness, Saint Lucy. During the village festival, every December 12–13, the streets of the village are strung with colorful banderitas, as is the façade of Santa Lucia Church. Pilgrims visit the church for the two-day celebration, with the novena to the saint beginning on December 4.

Bagbag Bridge
Bagbag Bridge was the site of the longest battle between the Americans and Filipinos led by General Gregorio del Pilar on April 25, 1899. The bridge is now a reminder of the valor displayed by the Filipino who triumphed against the American forces.

Education

Notable personalities
Servants of God Dionisia de Santa María Mitas Talangpaz (1691–1732) and Cecilia Rosa de Jesús Talangpaz (1693–1731): Sisters Dionisia and Cecilia Talangpas co-founded the Beaterio de San Sebastián. Their beatification process started in 1999, and they have both been deemed Servants of God while consideration for sainthood is in progress. Known for their exemplary lives of prayer, self-denial, service to the Church and apostolate that attracted young Filipinas.
 Gregorio Velasquez, National Scientist of the Philippines for Phycology
 Francisco O. Santos, National Scientist of the Philippines for Human Nutrition and Agricultural Chemistry
José Zabala-Santos - one of the most popular cartoonists in the Philippines during the 1950s for characters such Popoye, Sianong Sano, and Lukas Malakas.
Higino J. Fallorina  Award-winning cinematographer. Tatlong Maria (1944), Baguio Cadets (1950), Roberta (1951), Sa isang sulyap mo Tita (1953), Jack and Jill (1954), Nagkita si kerubin at tulisang pugot (1954), Anino ni Bathala (1958), Merill's Marauders (1962), Iginuhit ng tadhana: The Ferdinand E. Marcos story (1965), Counter spy (1966), Pogi (1967), Ang mangliligpit (1968), Palanca (1969), Sonny side (1971), Dalawang mukha ng tagumpay (1973), Lalaki, kasalanan mo (1973), krimen: Kayo ang humatol (1974), Katawang lupa (1975), Bamboo trap (1975), Mababagsik na anghel (1975), Saan ka pupunta, Miss Lutgarda Nicolas? (1975), Anna Karenina: Babaeng hiwalay sa asawa (1976), Halik na lumalatay (1977), Ang babae sa ulog (1981)

Incidents
In 2011 when Typhoon Nesat or "Pedring" and Typhoon Nalgae or "Quiel" battered Central Luzon consecutively within two months, thousands of families in Calumpit and nearby towns experienced neckdeep floods due to the rains, bursting dikes and the release of water from dams that had reached critical levels.

Gallery

Notes

External links

 [ Philippine Standard Geographic Code]
All About Calumpit Bulacan
Philippine Census information
Bulacan Provincial website
LGO:Municipality of Calumpit
Municipality of Calumpit
Samahang Calumpit - Canada

Municipalities of Bulacan
Populated places on the Pampanga River